Rotherham Town F.C. was a football club based in Rotherham, England. The club was a member of the Football League between 1893 and 1896.

History
The original club was founded in 1878 as Lunar Rovers, becoming Rotherham in 1882, and eventually Rotherham Town. In 1889 the club became a founder member of the Midland League. They were champions in 1892 and 1893, and were subsequently elected to the Second Division of the Football League in 1893.

The club's League tenure lasted just three seasons, finishing in 14th, 12th and 15th place (out of 16). At the end of the 1895/96 season they failed to apply for re-election and subsequently folded.

The club played at Clifton Lane and Clifton Grove.

Arthur Wharton, the man widely regarded as the first ever black professional footballer, played for the club from 1889 to 1894. Liverpool Football Club played their first ever fixture against Rotherham Town on 1 September 1892 in a friendly fixture, Liverpool won 7-1, the first ever opponent to score at Anfield was Rotherham striker Charlie Leatherbarrow.

A second Rotherham Town formed in 1899, going on to merge with Rotherham County in 1925 to form Rotherham United.

League and cup history

Honours
Midland League
Champions: 1891–92, 1892–93

Records
Best league performance: 12th, Football League Division 2
Best FA Cup performance: Second round, 1883–84, 1886–87, 1887–88

See also
:Category:Rotherham Town F.C. (1878) players

References

Association football clubs established in 1878
Association football clubs disestablished in 1896
Defunct English Football League clubs
Defunct football clubs in England
Defunct football clubs in South Yorkshire
Sport in Rotherham
Midland Football League (1889)
1878 establishments in England
1896 disestablishments in England